Parts of the Alternative for Germany (AfD) support Russia, its foreign policy, and its allies. Many AfD members and activists were listed as keeping close ties with Russian politicians and receiving financial benefits in OCCRP investigation of Russia's International Agency for Current Policy,  a.

Positions

Ukraine crisis and war in Donbass
In March 2019, then coparty leader Alexander Gauland said in an interview with the Russian newspaper Komsomolskaya Pravda that they consider the War in Donbass to be a Ukrainian internal matter, and that Germany should not get involved in the internal affairs of Ukraine or Russia. He also said the AfD is against Western sanctions imposed on Russia.

AfD rejects EU sanctions against Russia over the Ukraine conflict.

In September 2022, it was reported that 5 AfD politicians were planning to travel to occupied Donbas in eastern Ukraine.

Media
The Russian state foreign media agency Russia Today has since 2014 a German speaking outlet, which spread right wing conspiracy theories and several times promoted AfD-politicians and their positions. Often German AfD politicians got interviewed in the German and International RT programs.
The daily show The Missing Part ("Der fehlende Part") with which RT claims to send "what others do not say, what others do not show". RT is inviting guests like the AfD supporter Ken Jebsen, a journalist, who get kicked out of public broadcaster RBB after anti-semitism charges had been raised against him. RT Deutsch was reporting intensively about pro-Russian Berlin Monday demonstrations, which are closely linked to the right-wing populist publicist Jürgen Elsässer, editor-in-chief of Compact. Compact is de facto the voice of AfD.

Protagonists

Markus Frohnmaier

Markus Frohnmaier has been an AfD member of the Bundestag since 2017. The ZDF, Spiegel and other media had reported that the Kremlin had specifically supported Frohnmaier to promote Russian interests in the Bundestag. In a strategy paper of the Presidential Administration of Vladimir Putin, which is to come from the time before the general election in 2017, it is said that Frohnmaier "will be under absolute control". Further on "our people could also set up a non-profit organization, which will be registered with the Bundestag and can be promoted through the pro-Russian positions."

Udo Hemmelgarn
Udo Hemmelgarn has been an AfD member of the Bundestag since 2017. He supports the Assad government and demands German support of the Russian involvement in Syria. In 2019 Hemmelgarn organized a secret trip of four AfD members of the Bundestag to Syria. He is a strong supporter of a "new Syria-policy" in the Bundestag. For AfD that meant backing the Assad government and the supporting Russian government.

Robby Schlund
Robby Schlund has been an AfD member of the Bundestag since 2017. He delineates himself as a member of the right-wing factional cluster 'Der Flügel' (the wing) around Björn Höcke Under the chairmanship of Robby Schlund, for the first time in years, a German-Russian parliamentary group in 2019 was making efforts to establish better contacts from Germany with Russia.

Literature
 A. Shekhovtsov (2017): Russia and the Western far right: Tango Noir. Routledge.

References

Pro-Russia
Germany–Russia relations